Mamoon Kazi (1938—April 2, 2014) was a Pakistani judge.

Life

Since his retirement, Kazi led a quiet life in Karachi, but his name was mentioned in 2013 to be the National Accountability Bureau’s chairperson. He died on April 2, 2014, leaving behind his wife Rehana Kazi, two daughters, and a grandchild.

References

1938 births
2014 deaths
People from Karachi
Justices of the Supreme Court of Pakistan
Chief Justices of the Sindh High Court